Sayed Ikramuddin Masoomi was born in 1953 in Ashkmash district of Takhar. Masoomi has worked as the Director of Enterprises for the Ministry of Finance, as Deputy Minister of Finance as later as Governor of Takhar and Badakhshan Provinces.  After his time as Governor he became Minister of Labor and Social Affairs under President Karzai. In 2004 he was appointed as Minister of Work, Social Affairs, Martyred and Disabled. He was replaced in 2006 by Noor Mohammad Qarqeen. Sayed Ekramuddin Masomi then served for more than a year as Governor of Baghlan Province.

Notes

Labour ministers of Afghanistan
Social affairs ministers of Afghanistan
Afghan Tajik people
Living people
1953 births
Governors of Baghlan Province
Governors of Badakhshan Province
Governors of Takhar Province